The Critical Eye is a Discovery Science Channel documentary series examining pseudoscientific and paranormal phenomena. The eight-part documentary series aired from October 2002 through February 2003 and was hosted by actor and scientific skeptic William B. Davis.

Series description
The Critical Eye, alternately labeled as just Critical Eye, was produced by the Discovery Science Channel, and was produced in association with Skeptical Inquirer Magazine. The show was described by cosmolearning.org as "William B. Davis hosts this programme bringing to the viewers the science behind the paranormal and the unexplained."

Historical event references
The series discusses several notable events:
 The 1990 civil trial brought against Judas Priest alleging subliminal messaging in their music
 The Stargate Project
 The Phoenix Lights
 The Roswell UFO incident
 Project Blue Book
 The Heaven's Gate mass suicide

Episodes
Each episode of the series consists of four or five segments focused specifically on one pseudoscientific or paranormal phenomenon. Each segment begins by explaining the phenomenon in question, discusses it with both scientists/skeptics and proponents/believers, and concludes with street interviews regarding the legitimacy of the phenomenon in question.

References

American documentary television series
Documentary television series about science
English-language television shows
Scientific skepticism mass media
2000s American documentary television series
Pseudoscience
Reiki
Acupuncture
Alternative medicine
Energy (esotericism)
Telepathy
Homeopathy
Parapsychology
Vampirism
Hypnosis
Modern witchcraft
Exorcism
Bigfoot
Loch Ness Monster
Atlantis
Noah's Ark
Extraterrestrial life
Near-death experiences
Ghosts
Reincarnation
Mediumship
Psychics
Astrology
Nostradamus
Stonehenge
Pyramids